Shenlong is a Chinese reusable robotic spaceplane currently in development. Only a few pictures have appeared since it was revealed in late 2007.

Shenlong Test Platform 
The latest academic models shown in 2000, reveal a delta winged spaceplane with a single vertical stabilizer, equipped with three high-expansion engines. Presuming a seating arrangement of two crew members sitting side-by-side in the cockpit, dimensions could be very roughly estimated as a wingspan of 8 m, a length of 12 m and a total mass of 12 tonnes. This is within the payload capability of the Chinese CZ-2F or type A launch vehicles.

Shenlong Spaceplane 
Images of an aerodynamic scaled model, ready to be launched from under the fuselage of a Xian H-6 bomber, were first published in the Chinese media on 11 December 2007. Code named Program 863-706, the Chinese name of this spacecraft was revealed as "Shenlong Spaceplane" (神龙空天飞机). These images, possibly taken in late 2005, show the vehicle's black reentry heat shielding, indicating a reusable design, and its engine assembly. First sub-orbital flight of the Shenlong reportedly took place on 8 January 2011.

Earlier, images of the High-enthalpy Shock Waves Laboratory wind tunnel of the Chinese Academy of Sciences (CAS) State Key Laboratory of High-Temperature Gas Dynamics (LHD) were published in the Chinese media. Tests with speeds up to Mach 20 were reached in around 2001.

, the CAS academician Zhuang Fenggan (莊逢甘) said that a first test flight of the spaceplane would be conducted during the "Eleventh Five-Year Plan", meaning from 2006 to 2010. The state-owned Xinhua News Agency reported in 2017 that China planned to launch a reusable spacecraft in 2020 designed to "fly into the sky like an aircraft".

Launches 

Around 4 September 2020, China conducted a covert launch of a Long March-2F/T3 rocket from the Jiuquan Satellite Launch Center which is to believed to have carried a Chinese reusable experimental spacecraft (version of the Shenlong). For launching payloads like reusable experimental spacecraft, this Long March 2F/G needs to add four  cusps on its fairing to accommodate the payload (as seen in post launch fairings), developing thoughts that the spacecraft resembles US Boeing X37-B. Chinese media emitted a laconic report referring, that "the test spacecraft will be in orbit for a period of time before returning to the domestic scheduled landing site. During this period, it will carry out reusable technology verification as planned to provide technical support for the peaceful use of space".

On 4 August 2022 there was a second launch.

References 

Proposed reusable launch systems